The following is a list of National Collegiate Athletic Association (NCAA) Division III college ice hockey teams that have qualified for the NCAA Division III Men's Ice Hockey Championship as of 2022 with teams listed by number of appearances.

† Plattsburgh State's appearances from 1986 through 1988 were later vacated due to NCAA rules violations.

References

Appearances By Team